José Joaquin Dapena Thompson (born c. 1938), known as Josito, was a Puerto Rican politician and Mayor of Ponce, Puerto Rico from 22 February 1984 to 1988.

Schooling
Dapena graduated from the University of Salamanca, Spain, in 1965. He practiced law in the island until he got involved in politics. In 1984, he defeated the candidate from the PPD by a narrow margin for the position of Mayor of Ponce, Puerto Rico.

Mayoral term
Dapena Thompson became mayor of Ponce on 22 February 1984 upon the resignation as mayor of Jose G. Tormos Vega on that day. Later, in October of that year, he became bona fide mayor via the electoral vote.  In the interim, Ruben Quinones, the Ponce Municipal Secretary, was the acting mayor.  He was mayor until Ivan Ayala Cadiz assumed the mayoral post in December 1987 via nomination of the New Progressive Party. Ayala Cadiz was mayor until January 1989.

Resignation
In 1988, Dapena Thompson was "named an unindicted co-conspirator" of embezzlement of federal funds from HUD. As a result, he resigned as mayor.  Ivan Ayala Cadiz, former assistant dean at the Pontifical Catholic University of Puerto Rico School of Law, finished off Dapena Thompson's last few weeks' mayoral term.

Today
Dapena Thompson lived in Florida and worked with his son, José Dapena, as of counsel and notary. He has also served as legal advisor to senator Larry Seilhamer.

See also
 Ponce, Puerto Rico
 List of Puerto Ricans

References

Further reading
 Fay Fowlie de Flores. Ponce, Perla del Sur: Una Bibliográfica Anotada. Second Edition. 1997. Ponce, Puerto Rico: Universidad de Puerto Rico en Ponce. p. 124. Item 624. 
 Mariano Vidal Armstrong. Quien es quien en Ponce y leyendas de antaño. Ponce, Puerto Rico: Imprenta Fortuño. 1986. (Colegio Universitario Tecnológico de Ponce, CUTPO; Recinto Universitario de Mayaguez, RUM)
 Fay Fowlie de Flores. Ponce, Perla del Sur: Una Bibliografía Anotada. Segunda Edición. 1997. Ponce, Puerto Rico: Universidad de Puerto Rico en Ponce. p. 4. Item 22. 
 "Ponce." El Reportero. 9 de mayo de 1985. (Supplement) pp. S1-S52. Interview with Jose Joaquín Dapena Thompson.

Year of birth uncertain
1930s births
Living people
New Progressive Party (Puerto Rico) politicians
Mayors of Ponce, Puerto Rico
University of Salamanca alumni